Pentatrichia avasmontana is a species of flowering plant in the family Asteraceae. It is found only in Namibia. Its natural habitat is rocky areas.

References

avasmontana
Flora of Namibia
Least concern plants
Taxonomy articles created by Polbot